The women's heptathlon event at the 2011 All-Africa Games was held on 13–14 September.

Results

References
Results
Results

Heptathlon
2011 in women's athletics